Winnipeg Centre or Winnipeg Center may refer to:

 Winnipeg Centre (federal riding)
 Winnipeg Centre (provincial electoral division)
 Downtown Winnipeg
 Winnipeg North Centre
 Winnipeg South Centre
 Winnipeg Area Control Centre (CZWG), see Nav Canada